USS Snapper has been the name of more than one United States Navy ship, and may refer to:

 USS Snapper (Submarine No. 16), a submarine commissioned in 1910, renamed  in 1911, and decommissioned in 1919
 , a patrol boat in commission from 1918 to 1919
 , a submarine in commission from 1937 to 1945

United States Navy ship names